A cyst is a closed sac, having a distinct envelope and division compared with the nearby tissue. Hence, it is a cluster of cells that have grouped together to form a sac (like the manner in which water molecules group together to form a bubble); however, the distinguishing aspect of a cyst is that the cells forming the "shell" of such a sac are distinctly abnormal (in both appearance and behaviour) when compared with all surrounding cells for that given location. A cyst may contain air, fluids, or semi-solid material. A collection of pus is called an abscess, not a cyst. Once formed, a cyst may resolve on its own. When a cyst fails to resolve, it may need to be removed surgically, but that would depend upon its type and location.

Cancer-related cysts are formed as a defense mechanism for the body following the development of mutations that lead to an uncontrolled cellular division. Once that mutation has occurred, the affected cells divide incessantly and become cancerous, forming a tumor. The body encapsulates those cells to try to prevent them from continuing their division and contain the tumor, which becomes known as a cyst. That said, the cancerous cells still may mutate further and gain the ability to form their own blood vessels, from which they receive nourishment before being contained. Once that happens, the capsule becomes useless, and the tumor may advance from benign to cancerous.

Some cysts are neoplastic, and thus are called cystic tumors. Many types of cysts are not neoplastic, they are dysplastic or metaplastic. Pseudocysts are similar to cysts in that they have a sac filled with fluid, but lack an epithelial lining.

Terminology

 microcyst – a small cyst that requires magnification to be seen
 macrocyst – a cyst that is larger than usual or compared to others

Related structures
A pseudocyst is very similar to a cyst, but is a collection of cells without a distinct membrane (epithelial or endothelial cells).

A syrinx in the spinal cord or brainstem is sometimes inaccurately referred to as a "cyst".

Cysts by location

Female reproductive system

Nabothian cyst (on the surface of the cervix)
Ovarian cyst (ovary)
Paratubal cyst (in front of fallopian tube behind the ovary)

Vaginal cysts
Gartner's duct cyst (lateral to vaginal wall)
Bartholin's cyst (at vaginal introitus)
Skene's duct cyst (beside the urinary meatus)
Ectopic ureterocoele (around the urinary meatus)
Urethral diverticulum (in front of vaginal wall)

Male reproductive system 
 Rete tubular ectasia (within the rete testis)
 Epididymal cyst (in the epididymis)
 Hydrocele testis (testicle): clear fluid within the cavum vaginale
 Spermatocele (testicle): fluid within the head of epididymis

Cutaneous and subcutaneous
 Acne cyst – Pseudocysts associated with cystic acne - an inflammatory nodule with or without an associated epidermoid inclusion cyst
 Arachnoid cyst (between the surface of the brain and the cranial base or on the arachnoid membrane)
 Epidermoid cyst
 Myxoid cyst (cutaneous condition often characterized by nail plate depression and grooves)
 Pilar cyst (cyst of the scalp)
 Pilonidal cyst (skin infection near tailbone)
 Sebaceous cyst – sac below skin
 Trichilemmal cyst – same as a pilar cyst, a familial cyst of the scalp

Head and neck

 Odontogenic cyst
 Ceruminous cyst (ear)
 Chalazion cyst (eyelid)
 Mucous cyst of the oral mucosa
 Nasolabial cyst
 Thyroglossal cyst
 Vocal fold cyst

Chest
 Fibrous cyst (breast cyst)
 Pulmonary cyst (air pocket in the lung)
 Pericardial cyst (abnormal dilatation of pericardium)

Abdomen
Liver cysts
 Simple cysts
 Hydatid cysts
 Biliary cystadenoma
 Biliary cystadenocarcinoma
 Polycystic liver disease
 Adrenal cyst (glands located above the kidneys) - It is a rare disease, affecting 0.06 to 0.18% of autopsy studies. It constitutes 5.4 to 6.0% of adrenal gland diseases. There are five major types of adrenal cysts: simple or endothelial cysts, true or epithelial cysts, pseudocysts, parasitic cysts, and cysts not classified elsewhere. 7% of the cysts can be malignant.
 Renal cyst (kidneys)
 Pancreatic cyst
 Peritoneal inclusion cyst (lining of the abdominal cavity) - It is a cluster of fluid-filled cysts lining the abdominal cavity of reproductive age women with a history of pelvic, abdominal surgeries, or abdominal inflammation. Those affected maybe presented with an abdominal, pelvic, lower back that lasted for months.
Enteric duplication cyst

Central nervous system
 Choroid plexus cyst 
 Colloid cyst 
 Pineal gland cyst (in the pineal gland in the brain)
 Glial cyst
 Tarlov cyst (spinal canal)

Musculoskeletal system
 Aneurysmal bone cyst, a benign bone tumor with a radiographic cystic appearance.
 Baker's cyst or popliteal cyst (behind the knee joint)
 Mucoid cyst (ganglion cysts of the digits)
 Stafne static bone cyst (an anatomic variant with radiographic cystic appearance in the posterior mandible)
 Subchondral cyst (cysts near the bony joints)

Seen in various locations
 Dermoid cyst (seen in ovaries, testes, and many other locations, from head to tailbone)
 Ganglion cyst (hand and foot joints and tendons)
 Mucoid cyst (ganglion cysts of the digits)

Infectious cysts
 Cysticercal cyst – an infection due to the larval stage of Taenia sp. (Crain's backs)
 Hydatid cyst – an infection in the liver or other parts of the body due to the larval stage of Echinococcus granulosus (tapeworm)

Neoplastic cysts 
 Dermoid cyst
 Keratocystic odontogenic tumor
 Calcifying odontogenic cyst

Treatment
Treatment ranges from simple enucleation of the cyst to curettage to resection. There are cysts—e.g., buccal bifurcation cyst—that resolve on their own, in which just close observation may be employed, unless it is infected and symptomatic.

Cystic fibrosis
Despite being described in 1938 as "the microscopic appearance of cysts in the pancreas", cystic fibrosis is an example of a genetic disorder whose name is related to fibrosis of the cystic duct (which serves the gallbladder) and does not involve cysts.

This is just one example of how the Greek root cyst-, which simply means a fluid-filled sac, also is found in medical terms that relate to the urinary bladder and the gallbladder, neither of which involve cysts.

See also 
 List of cutaneous conditions

References

External links 

 
 

Gross pathology
 
Dermatologic terminology